The White Mountains of California and Nevada are a triangular fault-block mountain range facing the Sierra Nevada across the upper Owens Valley. The range's broad southern end is near the community of Big Pine, where Westgard Pass and Deep Springs Valley separate it from the Inyo Mountains. The narrow northern end is at Montgomery Pass, where U.S. Route 6 crosses. The Fish Lake Valley lies east of the range; the southeast part of the mountains are separated from the Silver Peak Range by block faulting across the Furnace Creek Fault Zone, forming a feeder valley to Fish Lake Valley. The range lies within the eastern section of the Inyo National Forest.

Ecology
Ecologically, the White Mountains are like the other ranges in the Basin and Range Province; they are dry, but the upper slopes from  hold open subalpine forests of Great Basin bristlecone pine on permeable dolomite and certain granite substrates and limber pine on less permeable rocky substrates. Middle slopes from  have somewhat denser stands of piñon pine and Utah juniper. These upper and lower conifer zones are often separated by a zone of mountain mahogany brush. Various subspecies of sagebrush (Artemisia tridentata) extend from surrounding valleys to the lower alpine zone.

A bristlecone pine, named Methuselah, located within the mountain range is the oldest known, verified living tree in the world, at  years old. Pine nuts from piñon pine stands were harvested as a winter staple food by Paiute Indians whose descendants still live in adjacent valleys.

The White Mountains also have small remnant groves of lodgepole pine, Jeffrey pine, ponderosa pine, Sierra juniper and aspen including an unusual dwarf variety. These species are common in the nearby and wetter Sierra Nevada range west of the Owens Valley and must have been more widespread in the White Mountains until Holocene droughts extirpated them in most of this drier range. A number of plant species are endemic to the White Mountains, including the White Mountains horkelia, Horkelia hispidula.

Fauna include two herds of bighorn sheep, mule deer, marmots and feral horses. Permanent streams have no native fish, but there are naturalized populations of trout including rare Paiute cutthroat trout which is protected from angling. Birds include Clark's nutcracker and other Corvidae which eat and cache pine nuts.

History
Cattle from ranches in surrounding valleys are still grazed under permit as high as the alpine zone. Historically sheep were also grazed in large numbers, introducing diseases from which the native Bighorn Sheep populations are still slowly recovering.

Geography

The summit is composed of Mesozoic metavolcanic rock – lava lifted and melted by rising granite. The volcano itself is long since gone.
The White Mountains are the highest range completely inside the Great Basin, although the adjacent Sierra Nevada Range along the basin's western edge has two higher summits.
The entire range is within the Inyo National Forest.

Hiking
A four-wheel drive road reaches the summit of White Mountain Peak from the south to service the summit laboratory of the White Mountain Research Center.

Pellisier Flats is a wide sloping bench at the 13000 foot level with rocky fields and short alpine vegetation. The bench includes Mt. Hogue at 12,743 ft. and further north Mt. Dubois at 13,559 ft., the high point on the plateau. Pellisier Flats is the broad spine of the White Mountains.

The crest crosses the California–Nevada state line just south of a final high summit at Boundary Peak , Nevada's high point. Boundary Peak is the "prow" of the triangular fault block. It has views directly down into valleys to the west, north and east that are hidden by the increasing width of the high plateau to the south. North of Boundary Peak the range rapidly loses altitude and ends at Montgomery Pass.

The west face of the White Mountains rises steeply out of Owens Valley. Climbing to any summit from this direction is a scramble with about  elevation gain. Eastern slopes are somewhat gentler and have numerous cirques left by Pleistocene glaciers and even a few snowfields persisting through most summers. Most of these cirques are entered or approached by jeep roads and offer scenic yet non-technical routes to the crest.

References

External links 

 Peakbagger info about the range
 White Mountain Peak climbing info
 White Mountain Research Center homepage
 Traverse of White Mountains crest
 Another traverse
 Proposed wilderness area under Boxer-Solis California Wild Heritage Act of 2006

 
Mountain ranges of Nevada
Mountain ranges of the Great Basin
Mountain ranges of the Mojave Desert
Mountain ranges of Inyo County, California
Mountain ranges of Mono County, California
Mountain ranges of Esmeralda County, Nevada
Mountain ranges of Mineral County, Nevada
Inyo National Forest
Owens Valley
Mountain ranges of Northern California